Buckhorn Lake, located south of Buckhorn, Kentucky, United States and northwest of Hazard, Kentucky off Kentucky Route 28, is a  reservoir created by the United States Army Corps of Engineers in 1967 by impounding the Middle Fork of the Kentucky River. The lake was flooded over top of a small township called Bowlingtown.

Buckhorn Lake is an impoundment of the Middle Fork of the Kentucky River. Buckhorn Dam is an earthen dam, 160 feet high and 1,020 feet in length at its crest, with a maximum capacity of 167,900 acre-feet and normal storage of 32,100 acre feet.  The origin of the lake's name is uncertain. Some claim the name is taken from the discovery of a buck's horn at a nearby salt lick. Others claim that it is named for a buck killed by Jerry Smith, the area's first settler.

Buckhorn Lake is home to a sizable population of muskie, making it an attractive destination for fishermen.

Climate
The climate in this area is characterized by hot, humid summers and generally mild to cool winters.  According to the Köppen Climate Classification system, Buckhorn Lake has a humid subtropical climate, abbreviated "Cfa" on climate maps.

History 
Construction of the dam began in 1956, just upstream of a very small village known as Bowlingtown. The residents of Bowlingtown were forced to move from their homes and given very little compensation for the land that was bought out by the Army Corps of Engineers. The most any family received was ten cents per acre of property, with no value being added for buildings, businesses or farms. Citizens of Bowlingtown were not happy with the project, but ultimately had no voice in the matter. Despite their best efforts the lake was created anyway. Among the citizens there was significant controversy surrounding the project, none more so than the family cemeteries that were forcibly dug up and moved without notifying the families of the deceased. Most families did not know their loved ones had been moved until years later. The individual cemeteries were combined into one that is nearly inaccessible for half the year.

Attractions 
Buckhorn Lake is home to Buckhorn Lake state park. The state lodge has the Bowlingtown History Museum, Bowlingtown Country Kitchen  , swimming pool, and miniature golf course.

An island in the middle of the lake has a cemetery where former residents of Bowlingtown are still laid to rest.

See also 
Buckhorn Lake State Resort Park

References

External links
Buckhorn Lake - US Army Corps of Engineers official site

1967 establishments in Kentucky
Reservoirs in Kentucky
Protected areas of Leslie County, Kentucky
Protected areas of Perry County, Kentucky
Daniel Boone National Forest
Dams in Kentucky
United States Army Corps of Engineers dams
Bodies of water of Leslie County, Kentucky
Bodies of water of Perry County, Kentucky
Protected areas established in 1967